Out of Africa may refer to:

Media 

Out of Africa, a 1937 memoir by Karen Blixen
Out of Africa (film), a 1985 film based on the book
Coronation Street: Out of Africa, a 2008 spin-off film from the British soap opera

Other uses 
Out of Africa I, an anthropological theory of the first migration of early human species more than 200,000 years ago, named after the book
Out of Africa II, an anthropological theory of the recent African origin of modern humans
Out of Africa Wildlife Park, a parka and zoo in Arizona
Out of Afrika, a British charity
"Out of Africa" theory (OOA), the model of the geographic origin and early migration of anatomically modern humans